The Psycho Realm is the first album by American hip hop group Psycho Realm. At this time the group consisted of Jacken, Duke, and B-Real. Later on B-Real had to leave the group due to his commitment to Cypress Hill. This album has no featured guests.

Track listing

Personnel
Vocalists

Gustavo Gonzalez - vocals, lyrics
Joaquin Gonzalez - vocals, lyrics (tracks: 1-3, 5-14)
Louis Freese - vocals, lyrics (tracks: 1-2, 4-14)
Eric Lance Correa - additional vocals (tracks: 13-14)

Instrumentalists

Eric Bobo - bass (track 8), keyboards (tracks: 3, 8), percussion (tracks: 2, 6, 8, 10)
Jason Roberts - bass (track 5)
Randy Craig Kantor - keyboards, mellotron
Jay Turner - scratches (tracks: 1, 7, 9)
Joseph Alexander - scratches (track 1)

Technicals

Joaquin Gonzalez - producer (tracks: 1-2, 5, 7-8, 10-12, 14), additional producer (tracks: 3, 6, 9, 13), mixing (tracks: 3, 6, 8, 11-12)
Louis Freese - producer (tracks: 7-8, 11-12), co-producer (tracks: 1-2, 5, 10), mixing (tracks: 1-2, 5, 7-14)
Jay Turner - producer (track 4)
Joseph Mario Nicolo - co-producer (track 10), mixing (tracks: 1-2, 5, 7, 9-11, 13-14)
Phil Nicolo - mixing (tracks: 3, 6)
Lawrence Muggerud - mixing (track 4)
Gustavo Gonzalez - mixing (track 6)
Eric Bobo - mixing (track 8)
Robert "Taj" Walton - additional mixing
Manny Lecuona - mastering
Eric Janko - recording
Ross Donaldson - recording
Jason Roberts - recording

Additional

Mark Machado - logo design
Estevan Oriol - cover photo

Samples

References

1997 albums
Psycho Realm albums
Ruffhouse Records albums